The 2009 Adelaide Sevens, promoted as the International Rugby Sevens Adelaide 2009, was a rugby sevens tournament that was part of the IRB Sevens World Series in the 2008–09 season. It was the Australian Sevens leg of the series, held between 3 and 5 April at the Adelaide Oval in South Australia.

South Africa retained their title, and took an almost unassailable lead in the 2008-09 IRB Sevens World Series, defeating rapidly improving Kenya in the final. England won the Plate, Samoa the Bowl and the US the Shield.

Format
The teams were drawn into four pools of four teams each. Each team played the other teams in their pool once, with 3 points awarded for a win, 2 points for a draw, and 1 point for a loss (no points awarded for a forfeit). The top two teams from each group progressed to quarter-finals in the main competition, with the winners of those quarter-finals competing in cup semi-finals and the losers competing in plate semi-finals. The bottom two teams from each group progressed to quarter-finals in the consolation competition, with the winners of those quarter-finals competing in bowl semi-finals and the losers competing in shield semi-finals.

Teams
The participating teams were:

Pool stages

The tournament started on the Friday night and Saturday with matches between teams in the same pool on a round robin basis. The following is a list of the recorded results.

Pool A
{| class="wikitable" style="text-align: center;"
|-
!width="200"|Team
!width="40"|Pld
!width="40"|W
!width="40"|D
!width="40"|L
!width="40"|PF
!width="40"|PA
!width="40"|+/-
!width="40"|Pts
|- 
|align=left| 
|3||3||0||0||78||41||+37||9
|- 
|align=left| 
|3||1||1||1||70||45||+25||6
|- 
|align=left| 
|3||1||1||1||69||55||+14||6
|- 
|align=left| 
|3||0||0||3||10||86||-76||3
|}

Pool B
{| class="wikitable" style="text-align: center;"
|-
!width="200"|Team
!width="40"|Pld
!width="40"|W
!width="40"|D
!width="40"|L
!width="40"|PF
!width="40"|PA
!width="40"|+/-
!width="40"|Pts
|- 
|align=left| 
|3||3||0||0||80||38||+42||9
|- 
|align=left| 
|3||2||0||1||47||40||+7||7
|- 
|align=left| 
|3||1||0||2||41||47||-6||5
|- 
|align=left| 
|3||0||0||3||26||69||-43||3
|}

Pool C
{| class="wikitable" style="text-align: center;"
|-
!width="200"|Team
!width="40"|Pld
!width="40"|W
!width="40"|D
!width="40"|L
!width="40"|PF
!width="40"|PA
!width="40"|+/-
!width="40"|Pts
|- 
|align=left| 
|3||3||0||0||84||15||+69||9
|- 
|align=left| 
|3||1||0||2||53||67||-14||5
|- 
|align=left| 
|3||1||0||2||39||65||-26||5
|- 
|align=left| 
|3||1||0||2||40||69||-29||5
|}

Pool D
{| class="wikitable" style="text-align: center;"
|-
!width="200"|Team
!width="40"|Pld
!width="40"|W
!width="40"|D
!width="40"|L
!width="40"|PF
!width="40"|PA
!width="40"|+/-
!width="40"|Pts
|- 
|align=left| 
|3||3||0||0||54||19||+35||9
|- 
|align=left| 
|3||2||0||1||85||22||+63||7
|- 
|align=left| 
|3||1||0||2||25||67||-42||5
|- 
|align=left| 
|3||0||0||3||19||75||-56||3
|}

Knockout

Play on the last day of the tournament consisted of finals matches for the Bowl, Plate, and Cup competitions. The following is a list of the recorded results.

Shield

Bowl

Plate

Cup

Statistics

Individual points

Individual tries

Reference list

External links 
 IRB Sevens
 Adelaide Sevens on irb.com

Adelaide
Adelaide Sevens
Australian Sevens